Robert F. Ruth (March 4, 1921 – December 3, 2018) was an American politician in the state of South Dakota. He was a member of the South Dakota State Senate. He served in the United States Navy and was a commander in the United States Naval Reserve. He was also a merchant. He died in December 2018 at the age of 97, several months after the death of his wife Claramae.

References

1921 births
2018 deaths
Democratic Party members of the South Dakota House of Representatives